It Ends with Us is a romance novel by Colleen Hoover, published by Atria Books on August 2, 2016. Based on the relationship between her mother and father, Hoover described it as "the hardest book I've ever written".

As of 2019, the novel had sold over one million copies worldwide and been translated into over twenty languages. A sequel titled It Starts with Us was published in October 2022.

Plot 
College graduate Lily Bloom moves to Boston with hopes of opening her own floral shop. Her recently deceased father was abusive towards her mother, who kept the abuse a secret, leading Lily to resent both of them. She reads through her old childhood diaries and remembers her first love Atlas Corrigan, who left but promised to return to her.

While wrestling with her feelings, she meets neurosurgeon Ryle Kincaid. They are mutually attracted to one another, but do not pursue a relationship as Lily is looking for commitment while Ryle is only interested in a casual fling. However, once Lily successfully starts her business, they continue to meet, and start a relationship.

One night, Lily laughs when Ryle accidentally drops a casserole, and he angrily pushes her to the ground before frantically apologizing. Lily is reminded of her father's treatment of her mother; while horrified, she decides they are different from her parents and accepts his apologies, but warns him that she will leave if he hurts her again.

While dining at a restaurant where Atlas works, Lily reconnects with him, making Ryle instantly jealous despite her insistence that Atlas is only a friend. Suspecting that Ryle may be abusing Lily after noticing her injuries, Atlas secretly gives her his phone number.

Lily and Ryle eventually get married, and have a stable marriage until he finds Atlas' number and assaults Lily. He then confesses that he accidentally shot and killed his brother Emerson as a child, resulting in trauma that causes him to have rage-filled episodes. Lily reconciles with him, but Ryle assaults her again after finding her childhood diaries, believing that she is having an affair with Atlas.

Lily escapes the house and calls Atlas. He takes her to the hospital, where she discovers she is pregnant with Ryle's child, which she opts to keep a secret from him. She stays with Atlas for several months while Ryle leaves the country for a fellowship. Atlas admits he still has feelings for her but has suppressed them because of Ryle. Finally understanding what her mother went through, Lily confides in her about the abuse.

When Ryle returns, Lily forms a tentative truce with him and allows him to help her through the final few months of her pregnancy, but remains emotionally distant from him. Lily later gives birth to a daughter, whom she names after Ryle's late brother. After giving birth, Lily realizes she does not want her daughter to grow up witnessing Ryle's aggressive outbursts, and tells him she wants a divorce. He tearfully begs her to reconsider, but finally understands her perspective and agrees to separate after she asks him how he would react if their daughter told him she was being abused by her partner. Lily hopes she has finally ended the cycle of abuse in her family, telling her daughter, "It ends with us."

In the epilogue, Lily, who is co-parenting with Ryle, finds Atlas and tells him that she is ready to restart her relationship with him.

Background and publication 
It Ends with Us was published by Atria Books on August 2, 2016. Based on the relationship between her mother and father, Hoover described it as "the hardest book I've ever written".

Reception 
In a starred review, Kirkus Reviews wrote, "The relationships are portrayed with compassion and honesty" and concluded that the novel "powerfully illustrates the devastation of abuse—and the strength of the survivors". Romantic Times wrote, "It Ends with Us is a perfect example of the author's writing chops and her ability to weave together uplifting, romantic and somber plotlines. No matter your level of fandom, readers will love and respect protagonist Lily and learn something from her struggles."

The novel won the 2016 Goodreads Choice Award for Best Romance.

Sales
As of 2019, the novel had sold over one million copies worldwide and been translated into over twenty languages.

In 2021, the novel–and Hoover's works overall–experienced a surge in popularity due to attention from the #BookTok community on TikTok. In January 2022, It Ends with Us debuted at #1 on The New York Times best sellers list. It was #1 on the Publishers Weekly adult list and #1 overall in the first six months of 2022, selling a total of 925,221 units. It Ends With Us had over one billion tags on TikTok.

Sequel 

In February 2022, it was announced that Atria Books would publish a sequel to It Ends with Us in October 2022. The follow-up, titled It Starts with Us, was published on October 18, 2022. The sequel continues from where It Ends with Us ended and centers on the relationship between Lily and Atlas.

Film adaptation 
In July 2019, Justin Baldoni optioned the novel for a film adaptation, produced through his Wayfarer Entertainment company. In October 2021, the first draft screenplay was completed. In January 2023, Blake Lively was cast in the role of Lily Bloom. Baldoni, who will play Ryle Kincaid, is set to direct and Christy Hall will adapt the script.

References 

2016 American novels
American romance novels
Atria Publishing Group books
Contemporary romance novels
Domestic violence in fiction
Novels set in Boston